Inner Journeys: Myth + Legends is an album by German cross-cultural new-age band Cusco, released in 2003. The album peaked at #6 on the Billboard Top New Age albums chart.

With this album, the band simultaneously explores new territory by covering Greek Mythology with its musical concepts, and also revisits a more classic Cusco sound by reintroducing the flute sounds of the early years (Water Stories) and the strings, guitars, and atmospheres of their mid-career commercial high points of Cusco 2000 and Apurimac II. Sonically, this album does continue to develop a very natural-sounding instrumentation that began to appear with Ancient Journeys, though it uses them to create a more mysterious vibe than that of the previous album. Also, Inner Journeys utilizes occasional backing vocals in a style previously unexplored by the band, giving this album a unique flavor among Cusco albums.

Track listing
 "Oracle Of Delphi"
 "Eros And Psyche"
 "Ariadne"
 "The Nine Muses"
 "Odysseus And The Sirens"
 "Aphrodite"
 "Janus"
 "Orpheus And Eurydice"
 "Pan And The Nymph"
 "Poseidon"

Album credits
Kristian Schultze -  Arranger, keyboard, programming 
Michael Holm – Arranger, keyboard, producer 
Johan Daansen – Acoustic guitar
Ernst Stroehr - Percussion
Jane Bogaert - Vocals
Matt Marshall – Executive producer
Dan Selene – Executive producer 
Ron McMaster – Digital mastering
William Aura – Mastering 
Frank Von Dem Bottlenberg - Mixing 
Murry Whiteman – Cover art 
Gina Grimes – Director of creative services 
Debra Holland – Liner notes 
Cusco – Main performer

References

2003 albums
Cusco (band) albums